Kapan Han is a han (caravanserai) in the Old Bazaar of Skopje, North Macedonia. It was built in the mid-15th century by Bosnian general Isa-Beg Isaković, ruler of Skopsko Krajište, in order to provide a regular source of income for his endowment (vakuf).

Etymology 
The name of the han is derived from the Arabic word kabban which was a device used for measuring the weight of sold goods at the entrance of the han.

Characteristics 

The Kapan Han has a surface area of 1,086 m². The building has two entrances, a ground level and second level. There were 44 rooms for guests and traders with their caravans. There was space for horses on the east side of the han. 

The neighbourhood surrounding Kapan Han was known as Kapan.

See also
Caravanserai
Old Bazaar, Skopje
Ottoman Vardar Macedonia

External links 
 Text about Cifte hammam on web site about Old Skopje

Caravanserais in the Balkans
Ottoman architecture in North Macedonia
Buildings and structures in Skopje
Caravanserais in North Macedonia
Old Bazaar, Skopje